David Abibssira (born 18 January 1963) is a French shooter. He competed in the 1984 Summer Olympics.

References

1963 births
Living people
Shooters at the 1984 Summer Olympics
French male sport shooters
Olympic shooters of France